Total Drama All-Stars  (often shortened as TDAS) and Total Drama: Pahkitew Island (often shortened as TDPI) are the two parts with 13-episode segments that both make up the fifth season of Total Drama. The season was commissioned by Cartoon Network in October 2012, ordering 26 episodes. It is a sequel to Total Drama Island, Total Drama Action, Total Drama World Tour, and Total Drama: Revenge of the Island. The season was produced by Fresh TV in association with the Aboriginal Peoples Television Network and distributed by Cake Entertainment. Owing to the series' premise, the season presents itself as a parody of reality television series, such as Survivor.

The entire season first premiered in the United States starting on September 10, 2013 on Cartoon Network with the first part, while the second part premiered in the United States on July 7, 2014 for a two-week time period. In Canada, the first part premiered on Teletoon during their "Can't Miss Thursdays" time slot starting January 9, 2014, while the second part of the season also premiered during their "Can't Miss Thursdays" time slot on Teletoon starting on September 4, 2014. The second half of the season also premiered on APTN in 2015. It returned on APTN from January to February 2017, but was dropped all together.

Synopsis
Just like Total Drama: Revenge of the Island, this season also consists of 13-episode segments; even though it brings back the traditional 26-episode length of the first three seasons. The winning characters for All-Stars are either Mike or Zoey, and the winning characters for Pahkitew Island are either Shawn or Sky (depending on the countries the season finale airs). The grand prizes for both parts of this season are both C$1,000,000.

All-Stars
Total Drama All-Stars is the first part of the season. Christian Potenza first announced the season in an interview with Tom McGillis (the creator of the series), saying that Total Drama All-Stars would be very similar to Total Drama Island and Total Drama: Revenge of the Island, due to the high worldwide ratings of the latter. That means that this part of the season takes place back at Camp Wawanakwa; in a single location once again, unlike Total Drama World Tour. This part is also very similar to the previous season, Total Drama: Revenge of the Island (both being very similar in terms of length, location, features and cameos).

This half is an all-star season which features a return of fourteen of the strongest contestants from both the first and second generation cast. This is the first season to feature characters from two different generations competing together. The theme for this season is "Heroes vs. Villains" which means the competitors were separated into teams based on their past performance; with "Heroes" from each season having to face off against each season's "Villains". Both the season's first title, "All-Stars" and the "Heroes vs. Villains" theme take after respective seasons from Survivor.

Cartoon Network's official synopsis describes the first part, Total Drama All-Stars as:

Pahkitew Island

Total Drama: Pahkitew Island is the second part of the fifth season. It was first announced on June 11, 2013 as a sixth season, even though it is still part of the fifth season. This part features an entire new cast considered as the third generation of Total Drama characters and takes place at a brand new island, due to Chef Hatchet using a land drill to sink Camp Wawanakwa in the episode, "The Final Wreck-ening". This new island is the first new main setting in the series since Total Drama Action.

Pahkitew Island aired in North America throughout the second half of 2014, but Italy was the first country to air Total Drama: Pahkitew Island starting on June 13, 2014. This is the first season to air a new episode every day in the United States. This part was story edited by Terry McGurrin, while Dennis Jackson and Melanie Jackson, series creators of Wapos Bay, also helped write and consult the plot for Pahkitew Island. Total Drama: Pahkitew Island was sponsored by the Aboriginal Peoples Television Network, who helped with the Cree translations for the team names and various season references.

A general synopsis from Teletoon describes the second part, Total Drama: Pahkitew Island as:

Plot
Both parts feature a fictional titular reality show that follows the competition of fourteen animated teenagers at a fictional island. For Total Drama All-Stars, the original island used in the first season is featured, where the producers say it is located somewhere in Muskoka, Ontario. The second part of the season, Total Drama: Pahkitew Island, features a brand new island which producers say it is located somewhere in Western Canada. The season's animated characters are depicted as campers who participate in themed challenges and must avoid being voted off the island by other fellow campers. At the end of the series, the winning contestant or the last camper to stand on the island will win C$1,000,000. The competition is hosted by Chris McLean (Christian Potenza), who is assisted by the camp's chef, Chef Hatchet (Clé Bennett).

At the beginning of the competition, the fourteen campers are evenly placed into two teams which are themed to the genre of the competition. In each episode, the two teams participate in a challenge, in which one or more campers can win invincibility for their team. The losing team is called to the campfire at night, where they must vote one of their members off the island. The camper with the most votes is eliminated from the competition. At this campfire, McLean passes out marshmallows to the campers who have not been voted off, while the one who does not get a marshmallow is eliminated. That eliminated person must then walk to the island's dock and will be forced off of the island, and told to "never, ever come back", according to Chris.

About halfway through the competition, the teams are disbanded, after which the challenges continue; the winner of each challenge then only receives invincibility for him or herself, whereupon a camper without invincibility is voted off the island. This process of elimination continues on until two players remains on the island. These two players, are now then subject to a final contest. At the end, a camper wins the competition, while the loser ends up being the runner-up. However, the runner-up is the winner in the other ending of the finale, as there are always two endings to Total Drama seasons. This season, along with every other season in the series, is a parody of the reality show Survivor while the host, Chris McLean is very similar to Survivor host Jeff Probst with the evil persona of Fear Factor Joe Rogan.

Episodes

The first part consisting of thirteen episodes is an all-star season using fourteen returning characters from the two previous seasons, while the last thirteen episodes consist of a new cast introducing fourteen new characters. Both halves are part of the 26 episodes that Cartoon Network ordered in 2012. Cartoon Network aired the whole season first starting on September 10, 2013 on Tuesdays at 7:00 p.m. EST in the United States, with Teletoon airing the season later on January 9, 2014 at 7:00 p.m. EST.

This season also features the 100th episode of the entire series which was aired in Canada on February 27, 2014. The 100th episode of the series is the 9th episode of this season, "Zeek and Ye Shall Find". All episodes for the fifth season are 21 minutes and 20 seconds long, all of them much shorter than previous seasons. This is the first season to feature a 20-second intro, as every other previous season had a full one-minute intro section.

All-Stars

Characters
7 characters from Total Drama World Tour and 7 characters from Total Drama: Revenge of the Island returned to compete in Total Drama All-Stars. They all competed together during several "Heroes vs. Villains" themed challenges, which means that all the heroes competed against all the villains.

Staff

Contestants
The 14 returning characters who competed in Total Drama All-Stars are Alejandro, Cameron, Courtney, Duncan, Gwen, Heather, Jo, Lightning, Lindsay, Mike, Sam, Scott, Sierra, and Zoey.

Elimination Table

Color Key
  Finalist: This contestant made it to the final of the competition.
  Win: This contestant won the challenge and/or was immune from elimination.
  Safe: This contestant was safe from elimination.
  Low: This contestant was supposed to be eliminated from the competition but used a McLean-Brand Chris Head, which granted them immunity.
  Low: This contestant was at risk of being eliminated.
  Eliminated: This contestant was eliminated.
  Eliminated: This contestant quit, was evacuated, or got disqualified.
  This contestant is out of the competition.

Pahkitew Island

Characters 

Total Drama: Pahkitew Island features an entire new cast. This is the second time the series completely replaces any existing cast with an all new cast. The new characters competing are Amy, Beardo, Dave, Ella, Jasmine, Leonard, Max, Rodney, Samey, Scarlett, Shawn, Sky, Sugar, and Topher.

Staff

Contestants

Elimination Table

Color Key 
  Finalist: This contestant made it to the final of the competition.
  Win: This contestant won the challenge and/or was immune from elimination.
  Safe: This contestant was safe from elimination.
  Low: This contestant was at risk of being eliminated.
  Eliminated: This contestant was eliminated.
  Eliminated: This contestant quit, was evacuated, or got disqualified.
  This contestant is out of the competition.

Production
On June 28, 2011, Christian Potenza mentioned an upcoming season of Total Drama. This was the first time a cast member mentioned a fifth season to the public. One year later on July 19, 2012, Christian Potenza announced a fifth season of Total Drama in an interview with Tom McGillis, saying that Season 5 will be just like Seasons 1 and 4. This hinted that this season will take place back at an island.

As shown in the Fresh TV official website, it seemed that there would be 26 new episodes to be aired in 2013–2014 for Season 5. Tom McGillis later stated that the new 26 episodes will be split into two 13-episode seasons; where the first part will feature some of the existing cast, while the second part will consist of an only new cast which are yet to be introduced. Voice actors began recording lines for Season 5 in December 2012.

Total Drama All-Stars
On January 28, 2013, Cartoon Network confirmed that the new season title will be Total Drama All-Stars for Part 1. Two days later on January 30, both Christian Potenza and Drew Nelson confirmed the title for Episode 4 which is "Food Fright". Drew Nelson also confirmed that the two new teams for this season are the Heroic Hamsters and the Villainous Vultures. Rumors started floating in early 2010 about the season being "Heroes vs. Villains" and that both the original and the new cast would compete together, but it wasn't until December 19, 2012 when Tom McGillis confirmed on ABC3 Australia that the theme for this season will indeed be "Heroes vs. Villains".

On February 1, 2013, Christian Potenza released a new video that contains several new information about Total Drama All-Stars, including season episode titles, new voice actors, and plot information.<ref
name="tdas.pt1"></ref> That same day, Christian Potenza also released the first lines of the season from Episode 4:

On June 11, 2013, it was confirmed that the airdate for the whole season will take place in early 2014; mostly during the winter of 2014. Tom McGillis later confirmed on Twitter that the Canadian airdate will be in January 2014, while the U.S. airdate will be in September 2013. On August 19, 2013, Cartoon Network released the first official trailer for Total Drama All-Stars along with a new website that reveals all the characters. Lindsay and Jo's eliminations were leaked via episode scripts and trailers before the season started airing.

Total Drama: Pahkitew Island
As for Total Drama: Pahkitew Island, production was done and it was released in the United States. The season was first announced to air on May 27, but was later delayed to July 7. This part is under the same production code as the previous part, Total Drama All-Stars. However, the script for the entire first episode was leaked online about a year before the season's release. Scarlett's final design along with one second of the fully animated first episode was also leaked on Instagram by her Venezuelan Spanish voice actor.

On March 21, 2014, the entire cast design was revealed by Fresh TV along with new promotions for the season. Bryn McAuley who will be voicing the twins, Amy and Samey, was the first confirmed voice actress. On April 9, 2014, Fresh TV Inc. celebrated the International Day of Pink by making the Pahkitew Island cast all wear pink clothing, symbolizing the support for anti-bullying. Before the official cast release Sunday Muse was also confirmed to voice Ella, while Ian Ronningen was set to voice Rodney. On May 30, 2014, a new teaser trailer was released for Total Drama: Pahkitew Island in Italy, marking the first time fully animated scenes were released to the public. Several trailers in English were released later on Cake Entertainment's website. On June 16, Cartoon Network posted the Pahkitew Island website, along with the audition tapes for Sugar, Samey, Amy, Leonard, and Max. Italy was the first country to air full episodes of Pahkitew Island. On June 23, the audition tapes of Beardo, Rodney, Ella, Topher, and Dave were released. On June 26, the entire cast and the characters they voiced were released via Fresh's re:fresh blog. On July 1, ABC3 announced that Total Drama: Pahkitew Island will air on July 14, 2014 in Australia.

Reception

Ratings
Total Drama All-Stars was the #1 telecast on Cartoon Network with the highest ratings for the week of the season premiere. Additionally, it ranked as the #1 telecast on all television among kids 6–11 and 9–14 for Tuesday prime-time airings. It also claimed #1 in its 7 p.m. time period among kids 9–14 and 6–11.

Critical reaction
Total Drama All-Stars has received mixed to negative reviews from critics, but overwhelmingly negative reviews from the show's fanbase. Many lamented the "character derailment" within the old and new cast of characters, the predictability of eliminations, the absurdity of the show despite its "reality show" premise, and for leaving many character arcs unresolved.  It currently holds a 5.4 rating on Metacritic based on 9 reviews. Like the previous season, both parts were criticised for their short length in comparison to the first three seasons. Total Drama: Pahkitew Island, however, was considerably more positive. However, there was some criticism regarding the stereotypes of the new cast, with many criticising the new contestants for being unrealistic and, as with All-Stars, for the lack of closure to certain character arcs.  The season currently holds a 73% approval rating according to Rotten Tomatoes.

See also
 Total Drama Island (the original set of contestants)

 Total Drama: Revenge of the Island (the first time a new cast was introduced)

Notes

References

External links

 Official TDAS site on Teletoon
 TDPI Promotional Article Cake Entertainment

Total Drama seasons
2010s Canadian animated television series
2010s Canadian satirical television series
Canadian adult animated comedy television series
Canadian children's animated comedy television series
Canadian flash animated television series
Canadian mockumentary television series
2014 Canadian television seasons
Split television seasons
Television shows filmed in Toronto